During the 1994–95 English football season, Grimsby Town F.C. competed in the Football League First Division.

Final league table

Results
Grimsby Town's score comes first

Legend

Football League First Division

FA Cup

League Cup

Squad

References

Grimsby Town F.C. seasons
Grimsby Town